The 71st Regiment of Foot was a Highland regiment in the British Army, raised in 1777. Under the Childers Reforms it amalgamated with the 74th (Highland) Regiment of Foot to become the 1st Battalion, Highland Light Infantry in 1881.

History

Formation 

The regiment was raised at Elgin by Major-General John Mackenzie, Lord MacLeod as the 73rd (Highland) Regiment of Foot (McLeod's Highlanders) from Highland clans in December 1777. A second battalion was formed in September 1778. The 1st battalion embarked for India in January 1779 and, having landed some troops at Gorée in Senegal on the way, reached Madras in January 1780. The flank companies were captured at Conjeveram in September 1780 during the Second Anglo-Mysore War. The battalion went on to take part in the Battle of Porto Novo in July 1781, the Battle of Pollilur in August 1781 and the Battle of Sholinghur in September 1781. After that the battalion took part in the siege of Cuddalore in June 1783.

Meanwhile, the 2nd battalion, commanded by Lieutenant Colonel George Mackenzie, embarked for the Mediterranean Sea and served as marines at the Battle of Cape St. Vincent in January 1780 before being landed at Gibraltar later that month and then taking part in the Great Siege of Gibraltar; the battalion was disbanded in 1783.

The regiment was redesignated as the 71st (Highland) Regiment of Foot (MacLeod's Highlanders) in 1786 and saw action at the siege of Seringapatam in February 1792 during the Third Anglo-Mysore War.

Napoleonic Wars

Remaining in India, the regiment fought at the siege of Pondicherry in August 1793 during the French Revolutionary Wars before transferring to Ceylon in August 1795 and returning to Scotland in August 1798.

A second battalion was again raised in October 1804 but remained in Scotland throughout the War. The 1st battalion embarked for the Cape of Good Hope in August 1805 and took part in the Battle of Blaauwberg in January 1806. The battalion then sailed for South America and took part in the disastrous expedition against Buenos Aires under Sir Home Popham. The battalion was taken prisoner and the Regimental Colours were captured. New colours were presented to the regiment by Lieutenant-General Sir John Floyd in April 1808.

The 1st battalion was reformed and embarked for Portugal in June 1808 for service in the Peninsular War. Renamed the 71st (Glasgow Highland) Regiment of Foot later that month, it saw action at the Battle of Roliça in August 1808, the Battle of Vimeiro later that month and Battle of Corunna in January 1809 before being evacuated from the Peninsula. In March 1809 it became a light infantry regiment, and the regiment next took part in the disastrous Walcheren Campaign in autumn 1809 before returning home and being renamed the 71st (Highland) Regiment of Foot (Light Infantry) in spring 1810.

The regiment returned to the Peninsular in September 1810 and saw action at the Battle of Fuentes de Oñoro in May 1811, the Battle of Arroyo dos Molinos in October 1811 and the Battle of Almaraz in May 1812 as well as the Battle of Vitoria in June 1813. It then pursued the French Army into France and fought at the Battle of the Pyrenees in July 1813, the Battle of Nivelle in November 1813 and the Battle of the Nive in December 1813 as well as the Battle of Orthez in February 1814 and the Battle of Toulouse in April 1814. The battalion returned home in July 1814 and then embarked for Ostend in April 1815: it saw action as part of the 3rd Brigade at the Battle of Waterloo in June 1815.

The Victorian era 
The regiment embarked for Canada in May 1824 and then moved on to Bermuda in October 1831 before returning to England in September 1834. It returned to Canada in April 1838 and then moved to Antigua in December 1844 before returning home in January 1847. The regiment embarked for Corfu in 1853 and then landed in the Crimea for service in the Crimean War: it saw action at the siege of Sevastopol in winter 1854. The regiment went on to India to help suppress the Indian Rebellion in 1857 and remained there for the Ambela Campaign in 1863. The regiment returned home in 1865 and then embarked for Gibraltar in 1868 before returning home again in 1880.

As part of the Cardwell Reforms of the 1870s, where single-battalion regiments were linked together to share a single depot and recruiting district in the United Kingdom, the 71st was linked with the 78th (Highlanders) Regiment of Foot, and assigned to district no. 55 at Cameron Barracks in Inverness. On 1 July 1881 the Childers Reforms came into effect and the regiment amalgamated with the 74th (Highland) Regiment of Foot to form the 1st and 2nd Battalions, Highland Light Infantry.

Battle honours
Battle honours awarded to the regiment were:

 Hindoostan
 Cape of Good Hope 1806
 Peninsular War: Rolica, Vimiera, Corunna, Fuentes d'Onor, Almaraz, Vittoria, Pyrenees, Nive, Orthes, Peninsula
Napoleonic Wars: Waterloo
 Crimean War: Sevastopol
 Central India

Colonels
Colonels of the regiment were:

73rd (Highland) Regiment of Foot (MacLeod's Highlanders)
1777–1789: Maj-Gen. John Mackenzie, Lord MacLeod

71st (Highland) Regiment of Foot (MacLeod's Highlanders) – 1786
1789–1803: Gen. Hon. William Gordon of Fyvie
1803–1809: Gen. Rt. Hon. Sir John Cradock, 1st Baron Howden

71st (Glasgow Highland Light Infantry) Regiment of Foot – 1809
1809–1824: Gen. Francis Dundas

71st (Highland) Regiment of Foot (Light Infantry) – 1810
1824–1829: Gen. Sir Gordon Drummond, GCB
1829–1838: Gen. Sir Colin Halkett, KCB, KCH
1838–1841: Lt-Gen. Sir Samuel Ford Whittingham, KCB, KCH
1841–1848: Lt-Gen. Sir Thomas Reynell, 6th Baronet, KCB
1848–1849: Lt-Gen. Sir Thomas Arbuthnot, KCB
1849–1857: Gen. Sir James Macdonell, GCB, KCH
1857–1863: Gen. Sir Thomas Erskine Napier, KCB
1863–1870: Gen. Hon. Charles Grey
1870–1874: Lt-Gen. Robert Law, KCB
1874–1880: Gen. Hon. Sir George Cadogan, KCB
1880–1881: Gen. John Hamilton Elphinstone Dalrymple, CB (to Highland Light Infantry)
1881: Regiment amalgamated the 74th (Highland) Regiment of Foot to form the Highland Light Infantry

See also 
78th Fraser Highlanders
Highland Light Infantry

References

Sources

External links 
Clan Fraser Society of Canada
History of the MacLeod's Highlanders

Infantry regiments of the British Army
Highland regiments
Highland Light Infantry
Regiment of Foot, 71st
Military units and formations established in 1758
Military units and formations disestablished in 1881